Mike Hogan may refer to:

 Mike Hogan (American football) (born 1954), former NFL running back
 Mike Hogan (athlete) (born 1943), British Olympic hurdler
 Mike Hogan (The Cranberries) (born 1973), member of Irish alternative rock band The Cranberries
 Mike Hogan, member of Christian rock band David Crowder Band
 Mike Hogan (sportscaster) (born 1963), Canadian sportscaster
Mike Hogan (Florida politician), Duval County supervisor of elections, former tax appraiser, and former state legislator

See also
 Michael Hogan (disambiguation)